Terry Jones is the founder and former CEO of Travelocity, chairman of Kayak.com, CIO of Sabre Inc., and motivational speaker.

A graduate of Denison University in Granville, Ohio, Jones entered the travel industry in 1971 as a travel agent with Vega Travel in Chicago. He later served as vice president of Travel Advisors for five years, a company specializing in business travel to Eastern Europe and the USSR, with offices in Chicago and Moscow. Jones has served on boards for Earthlink, Overture Services Corp (until sold to Yahoo!), Entrust, Inc, La Quinta Corporation (until sold to Blackstone) and Vendare Media until the board size was reduced.

He lectures worldwide about innovation and building digital relationships in business and holds several patents. He serves on the board of directors of Luxury Link, Rearden Commerce and Smart Destinations. He is chairman of the board of Kayak.com, and is a special venture partner with General Catalyst Partners.

Jones is also a consultant, in his company Essential Ideas.

In an April 2021 interview with Kent German, a Senior Managing Editor for CNET, Terry suggests COVID vaccination should not be kept private and likens vaccination status to that of someone having a disability stating, "If someone finds out my vaccination status, I'm not sure that's a bad thing."

References

American chief executives of travel and tourism industry companies
Living people
Denison University alumni
Chief information officers
Year of birth missing (living people)